Scintillation can refer to:
Scintillation (astronomy), atmospheric effects which influence astronomical observations
Interplanetary scintillation, fluctuations of radio waves caused by the solar wind
Scintillation (physics), a flash of light produced in certain materials when they absorb ionizing radiation
Scintillation (radar), an apparent rapid target displacement occurring on radar displays
Scintillation (medicine), a rapidly oscillating pattern of visual distortions, often associated with migraine aura
Scintillation counter, a device that measures ionizing radiation
Scintillating grid illusion, an image in which compounded color contrasts cause an optical illusion of visual artifacts

See also
Scintillate (horse), a British-trained thoroughbred racehorse